Ivo Garrani (6 February 1924 – 25 March 2015) was an Italian actor and voice actor. In films since 1952, Garrani is possibly best known for his role as Prince Vajda in Mario Bava's Black Sunday (1960).

Biography 
Born  in Introdacqua, Garrani was a student at the Faculty of Engineering in Rome when started his theatrical career, at first as amateur, then entering the stage company of Carlo Tamberlani in 1943. Aside from his work on stage, including works with Giorgio Strehler, in the fifties he started a parallel activity in cinema, starring in a great number of films, even if usually in secondary roles.

Garranidied on 25 March 2015, at the age of 91.

Selected filmography 

Ragazze da marito (1952) - Tommaso Spadoni
Orient Express (1954)
Eighteen Year Olds (1955) - Il medico
The Rival (1956) - Secondo ufficiale inquirente
Roland the Mighty (1956) - Carlo Magno
Terrore sulla città (1957)
Hercules (1958) - Pelias, King of Iolcus
Città di notte (1958) - Un dottore
Slave Women of Corinth (1958) - Antigono
The Day the Sky Exploded (1958) - Prof. Herbert Weisse
Il padrone delle ferriere (1959) - Monsieur Moulinet
Le Fric (1959) - Belar
General della Rovere (1959) - Partisan chief (uncredited)
The Giant of Marathon (1959) - Creuso
Vento del sud (1959) - Padrino
Carthage in Flames' (1960) - ThalaLa strada dei giganti (1960) - Vincent MicocciL'ultimo zar (1960)Black Sunday (1960) - Prince VajdaAtom Age Vampire (1960) - Prince VajdaAdua and Friends (1960) - L'Avvocato - Adua's ex-customerMorgan, the Pirate (1960) - Governor Don José GuzmanThe Hunchback of Rome (1960) - MorettiHercules and the Conquest of Atlantis (1961) - Re di Megalia
 Dreams Die at Dawn (1961) - AndreaTen Italians for One German (1962) - Giovanni FerroniThe Slave (1962) - Julius Caesar - Roman TriunvirThe Legion's Last Patrol (1962) - Colonel DionneThe Captive City (1962) - MavrotiThe Shortest Day (1963) - Erede Siciliano (uncredited)The Verona Trial (1963) - Roberto FarinacciThe Leopard (1963) - Colonel PallavicinoThe Betrothed (1964) - L'InnominatoCyrano et d'Artagnan (1964)Senza sole nè luna (1964)Casanova 70 (1965) - Il avvocatoI grandi condottieri (1965) - Gedeone / GideonLa jeune morte (1965) - Le pèreThe Rover (1967) - ScevolaOn My Way to the Crusades, I Met a Girl Who... (1967) - Duca PandolfoDeadly Inheritance (1968) - LeonL'amante di Gramigna (1969) Waterloo (1970) - Marshal SoultLiberation III: Direction of the Main Blow (1971) - MussoliniMaddalena (1971)Siamo tutti in libertà provvisoria (1971) - Attorney GeneralCaliber 9 (1972) - Don VincenzoBronte: cronaca di un massacro che i libri di storia non hanno raccontato (1972) - Nicola LombardoUn apprezzato professionista di sicuro avvenire (1972) - Lucetta's father (1972) - LubianskiSection spéciale (1975) - L'amiral François Darlan, vice-président du ConseilStreet People (1976) - Salvatore FrancescoItalia: Ultimo atto? (1977)Holocaust 2000 (1977) - Prime MinisterThe Repenter (1985)Soldati - 365 all'alba (1987) - ColonelIl muro di gomma  (1991) - Copo Stato Maggiore della DifesaNel continente nero (1993) - Monsignor FantazziniDio c'è (1998) - Ettore, Riccardo's fatherZora the Vampire (2000) - PriestThe Good Pope: Pope John XXIII (2003) - Cardinal CarcanoMarcello Marcello'' (2008) - Delegate

References

External links

1924 births
2015 deaths
Italian male film actors
Italian male stage actors
Italian male voice actors
People from the Province of L'Aquila